The men's tournament of the Volleyball competition at the 2019 Pacific Games was held from July 11–20, 2019 at the National University of Samoa Gymnasium in Apia, Samoa. Tahiti won the gold medal by defeating Wallis and Futuna in the final.

Participating teams
Eleven men's teams participated in the tournament:

Pool A

Pool B

Pool C

Pool D

Preliminary round

Pool A

Pool B

Pool C

Pool D

Second round

Pool E

Pool F

9th–11th playoffs

Pool G

Final round

Quarterfinals

5th–8th semifinals

Semifinals

7th place match

5th place match

Bronze medal match

Gold medal match

See also
 Volleyball at the 2019 Pacific Games – Women's tournament

References

Pacific Games men
Volleyball at the 2019 Pacific Games